Jesse James Hudson (born July 22, 1948) is an American former professional baseball pitcher who appeared in a single Major League Baseball (MLB) game in 1969.

High school
Hudson was born in Mansfield, Louisiana and played football quarterback and pitcher at Mansfield High School with Vida Blue. They both graduated and were drafted in the June Baseball draft of 1967.

Career
Hudson was drafted in the 11th round (203rd overall) of the 1967 MLB draft by the New York Mets. He went on to play four season in the Mets' minor league farm system, 1967 through 1970.

On September 19, 1969, Hudson made his one and only major league appearance, pitching the final two innings of a Mets home loss to the Pittsburgh Pirates at Shea Stadium. It was the second game of a doubleheader (baseball). He faced 10 batters, allowing one run on two hits while striking out three batters and walking two. One of the batters he struck out was future Baseball Hall of Fame inductee Willie Stargell. He finished with a 4.50 ERA.

During Hudson's final professional season of 1970, he pitched for the Mets' Triple-A team, the Tidewater Tides, registering a 2.86 ERA in 26 games (13 starts) with a 6–7 record, while striking out 79 in 107 innings pitched.

In June 2019, the Mets accidentally included Hudson in a video meant to honor deceased members of their 1969 championship team; the Mets later apologized to Hudson.

References

External links

1948 births
Living people
Major League Baseball pitchers
New York Mets players
Mankato Mets players
Visalia Mets players
Marion Mets players
Tidewater Tides players
Pompano Beach Mets players
Memphis Blues players
Baseball players from Louisiana
People from Mansfield, Louisiana